Loxostigma is a genus of flowering plants belonging to the family Gesneriaceae.

Its native range is Himalaya to Southern China and Indo-China.

Species:

Loxostigma brevipetiolatum 
Loxostigma cavaleriei 
Loxostigma damingshanense 
Loxostigma dongxingensis 
Loxostigma fimbrisepalum 
Loxostigma glabrifolium 
Loxostigma griffithii 
Loxostigma hekouensis 
Loxostigma kurzii 
Loxostigma longicaule 
Loxostigma mekongense 
Loxostigma musetorum

References

Didymocarpoideae
Gesneriaceae genera